The 16th Vuelta a España (Tour of Spain), a long-distance bicycle stage race and one of the three grand tours, was held from 26 April to 11 May 1961. Antonio Suárez won the points classification and Antonio Karmany won the mountains classification.

Teams and riders

Route

Results

References

 
1961 in road cycling
1961
1961 in Spanish sport
1961 Super Prestige Pernod